Kaniegue is a commune in the Cercle of San in the Ségou Region of Mali. The principal town lies at Dioundiou Konkankan. As of 1998 the commune had a population of 5,559.

References

Communes of Ségou Region